Josef Eduard Teltscher (15 January 1801 in Prague, Bohemia – 7 July 1837 in Piraeus, Greece) was an Austrian painter and lithographer. He was one of the best Viennese portrait lithographers and watercolourists of the first half of the nineteenth century in Central Europe, and as a miniaturist, according to his contemporaries, he was no less than Moritz Daffinger himself.

Life
Teltscher began his apprendiship in lithography in (Brno) and then from 1823 he was a student at the Vienna Academy. He was one of the first and most outstanding portrait lithographers in Vienna of the Biedermeier period and already had dealt with this new technology even before Josef Kriehuber. From 1829 to 1832, he had a very fruitful and successful period in Graz.

He was close to Franz Schubert and his circle of friends and created the most authentic portraits of the master. Also, he was with Ludwig van Beethoven on his deathbed. These blades were, as described in Die Welt von Gestern, owned by Stefan Zweig, but that are property of the British Library today. On 7 July 1837, Teltscher drowned on a study trip in the port of Piraeus near Athens, Greece.

See also
Etching
Gouache

Additional informations

References

Attribution
This article is based on the translation of the corresponding article on the German Wikipedia. A list of contributors can be found there at the History section.

Further reading
Teltscher, Josef Eduard. In Constantin von Wurzbach, Biographisches Lexikon des Kaisertums Österreich, 43. Band, S. 268, Wien 1881

Gallery

External links

19th-century Austrian painters
19th-century Austrian male artists
Austrian male painters
Artists from Prague
Austrian lithographers
Deaths by drowning
Accidental deaths in Greece
Academy of Fine Arts Vienna alumni
1801 births
1837 deaths